Michael Teo Yu Keng is a Malaysian politician and gynaecologist who served as the Member of Parliament (MP) for Miri from May 2013 to November 2022. He is a member of the People's Justice Party (PKR), a component party of presently the Pakatan Harapan (PH) and formerly Pakatan Rakyat (PR) opposition coalitions. He also served as Vice President of PKR from June 2020 to July 2022. He is also a practicing gynaecologist at Teo's Clinic and Maternity Centre.

Political career
Teo entered the political arena as one of the pioneering members of PKR's Sarawak branch in 1999. He went on to contest in his maiden election at the 2001 Sarawak state election in September that year for the seat of Senadin against the incumbent, Lee Kim Shin from the Sarawak United People's Party (SUPP) in a losing effort.

In March 2008, Teo contested in the 2008 Malaysian general election, making his first attempt for the newly-created parliamentary seat of Sibuti. He was unsuccessful in his campaign against Ahmad Lai Bujang from the United Bumiputera Heritage Party (PBB).

A decade after first contesting for the Senadin state seat, Teo entered the 2011 Sarawak state election as a candidate for the same seat, once again running against SUPP's three-term incumbent, Lee. Teo again lost out to Lee, but with a razor thin majority of just 58 votes.

Teo registered to contest for the Miri parliamentary seat in the 2013 Malaysian general election on April 20, 2013. Teo defeated SUPP's secretary-general, Sebastian Ting Chiew Yew, in a three-corner fight to become a first-time MP.

Teo was announced as PKR's and the Alliance of Hope's (PH) candidate to defend the Miri parliamentary seat in the 2018 Malaysian general election on April 14, 2018. Despite Miri being one of the targeted seats for SUPP to re-capture, Teo emphatically retained his seat with an increased majority. Later in July 2018, Teo was re-elected unopposed as chairperson of PKR's Miri branch.

In March 2020, Teo ran unsuccessfully for the chairman-ship of PKR's Sarawak state liaison committee. The new chairperson, Julau MP, Larry Sng Wei Shien, appointed Teo as one of three vice-chairmen instead. In June 2020, Teo was appointed by Port Dickson MP and PKR president Anwar Ibrahim as a PKR vice-president (representing Sabah and Sarawak) to replace Lubok Antu MP Jugah Muyang (who himself was appointed to replace another defector, Saratok MP Ali Biju) who defected from the party during the 2020 Malaysian political crisis.

Election results

References

Living people
People from Sarawak
Members of the Dewan Rakyat
Malaysian politicians of Chinese descent
People's Justice Party (Malaysia) politicians
21st-century Malaysian people
21st-century Malaysian politicians
Year of birth uncertain
Year of birth missing (living people)